Russell B. Mayberry (December 22, 1925 – July 27, 2012) was an American television director.

Early life and career
Mayberry was born on December 22, 1925, in Duluth, Minnesota. He later moved to Chicago, Illinois, after serving as a Navy aviator during World War II. He was educated at Northwestern University.

Throughout a career that started in 1947, Mayberry amassed a number of credits in television. His credits include The Monkees, Bewitched, I Dream of Jeannie, That Girl, The Brady Bunch, The Partridge Family, The Andy Griffith Show, Alias Smith and Jones, McCloud, Marcus Welby, M.D., The Rockford Files, Kojak, The Fall Guy, Baa Baa Black Sheep, Miami Vice, Dallas, Star Trek: The Next Generation , In the Heat of the Night, Matlock, The Rebels and other series.

Later career
He directed Unidentified Flying Oddball (1979) starring Dennis Dugan for Walt Disney Productions. He also directed a number of television films, including Sidney Shorr: A Girl's Best Friend.

His last directorial credit was an episode of the Prime Time Entertainment Network series Pointman in 1995.

Personal life
Mayberry lived in Los Angeles, California, in Evergreen, Colorado , and in Fort Collins, Colorado. He died on July 27, 2012, at Fort Collins Medical Center. He is survived by his wife Sandy, his two children, and his grandson and granddaughter.

References

External links
 
 

1925 births
2012 deaths
American film directors
American television directors
People from Duluth, Minnesota
Northwestern University alumni